Terminalia myriocarpa, the East Indian almond, is a tree species in the genus Terminalia found in Southeast Asia.

Ecology
The larvae of the moth Acrocercops terminaliae feed on T. myriocarpa.

Chemistry
The phenolic compounds methyl (S)-flavogallonate, gallic acid, methyl gallate, ethyl gallate, 2,3-di-O-[(S)-4,5,6,4′,5′,6′-hexahydroxybiphenyl-2,2′-diyldicarbonyl]-(α/β)-D-glucopyranose, vitexin, isovitexin, orientin, iso-orientin, kaempferol 3-O-β-D-rutinoside, rutin, neosaponarin, ellagic acid, flavogallonic acid and (α/β)-punicalagin can be isolated from the leaves of T. myriocarpa.

References

External links

myriocarpa
Plants described in 1871